Sault may refer to:

Places in Europe
 Sault, Vaucluse, France
 Saint-Benoît-du-Sault, France
 Canton of Sault, France
 Canton of Saint-Benoît-du-Sault, France
 Sault-Brénaz, France
 Sault-de-Navailles, France
 Sault-lès-Rethel, France
 Sault-Saint-Remy, France

Places in North America
 Sault Ste. Marie, a cross-border region in Canada and the United States
 Sault Ste. Marie, Ontario, Canada
 Sault Ste. Marie, Michigan, United States
 Sault College, Ontario, Canada
 Sault Ste. Marie Canal, a National Historic Site of Canada in Sault Ste. Marie, Ontario
 Sault Locks or Soo Locks, a set of parallel locks which enable ships to travel between Lake Superior and the lower Great Lakes operated and maintained by the United States Army Corps of Engineers
 Long Sault, a rapid in the St. Lawrence River
 Long Sault, Ontario, Canada
 Sault-au-Récollet, Montreal, Quebec, Canada
 Grand Sault or Grand Falls, New Brunswick, Canada

People with the surname
 Ray Sault (born 1952), Australian rules footballer
 Richard Sault (died 1702), English mathematician, editor and translator

Other uses
 Sault (band), a British rhythm and blues music collective
 Sault Tribe of Chippewa Indians, an indigenous community located in what is now known as Michigan's Upper Peninsula
 Saulteaux, a branch of the Ojibwe nation

See also
 Salt (disambiguation)
 Saulx (disambiguation)
 Sioux (disambiguation)
 Soo (disambiguation)
 Sue (disambiguation)
 Su (disambiguation)